21-29 Kent Street is a heritage-listed row of shops with second-storey residences at 21, 23, 25, 27 and 29 Kent Street, in the inner city Sydney suburb of Millers Point in the City of Sydney local government area of New South Wales, Australia. It is also known as Edwardian Shop and Residences. It was added to the New South Wales State Heritage Register on 2 April 1999.

History 
Millers Point is one of the earliest areas of European settlement in Australia, and a focus for maritime activities.  This is a well-detailed commercial development with residences above.  It was built  as part of the post-bubonic plague redevelopment by the Sydney Harbour Trust.  It was first tenanted by the NSW Department of Housing in 1986.

Description 
An interesting Federation-style two-storey stone and face brick detailed Edwardian shop/residence, one of a group. It forms an important streetscape element. It features a recessed verandah, slate roof, decorative ventilators to gable ends, and awnings over footpaths tied back with iron rods.

The shop fronts have been altered over time. Services have been added to the external fabric.

Heritage listing 
An interesting, well detailed early twentieth century commercial development which was carried out as part of the post-plague redevelopment of the area. Very important to the Millers Point streetscape.

It is part of the Millers Point Conservation Area, an intact residential and maritime precinct. It contains residential buildings and civic spaces dating from the 1830s and is an important example of nineteenth-century adaptation of the landscape.

Edwardian Shop was listed on the New South Wales State Heritage Register on 2 April 1999.

See also 

Australian residential architectural styles

References

Attribution

External links

 

New South Wales State Heritage Register sites located in Millers Point
Federation style architecture
Houses in Millers Point, New South Wales
Retail buildings in New South Wales
Articles incorporating text from the New South Wales State Heritage Register
Buildings and structures completed in 1911
1911 establishments in Australia
Millers Point Conservation Area